Michael D. Prysner (born June 15, 1983) is an American socialist political activist. He is a U.S. Army veteran who served in Iraq as a specialist. His duties in Iraq included ground surveillance, home raids and the interrogation of prisoners. According to Prysner, these experiences led him to take an anti-war stance.

Activism 
He is the co-founder of March Forward, an organization of active-duty members of the U.S. military and veterans of the Iraq and Afghanistan wars that encourages current active-duty service personnel to resist deployment.

In March 2008, Prysner was a member of a panel discussing the topic Winter Soldier: Iraq & Afghanistan in Maryland. He spoke about his time in Iraq as a soldier and his personal views about the two wars. This address became known as the "Our Real Enemies" speech.

Prysner is a member of Party for Socialism and Liberation and A.N.S.W.E.R. In 2008, he ran a write-in campaign for the U.S. House of Representatives for Florida's 22nd congressional district.

In November 2011, Prysner was arrested in Occupy Los Angeles. He was released after posting bail.

On September 19, 2021, Prysner interrupted a George W. Bush speech in Beverly Hills, California. He demanded an apology for lying about weapons of mass destruction and causing the deaths of a million Iraqis. He also stated "You sent me to Iraq" and "My friends are dead because you lied."

Media production 
Prysner is a producer and co-writer for the program The Empire Files, with his wife Abby Martin.  English-language Telesur canceled the show in 2018, and it later moved to a web publishing model. Prysner, Martin, and other Telesur contract journalists had their funding blocked by the application of United States sanctions against Venezuela. Academic Stuart Davis cites the cancellation as an example of how United States sanctions hamper public funding of media production in Venezuela.

He performed the rap "Skit 6" on the album Soundtrack to the Struggle.

He currently hosts the Eyes Left podcast with former US Army Cadet and Afghanistan War veteran Spenser Rapone.

See also 
 The Iraq Solidarity Campaign

References

External links

American people of Middle Eastern descent
1983 births
Living people
United States Army personnel of the Iraq War
Politicians from Tampa, Florida
Party for Socialism and Liberation politicians
21st-century American politicians
American left-wing activists
Florida Atlantic University alumni
Military personnel from Florida
American anti-war activists
Activists from Florida
Jewish American activists